Takeshi Salvador Fujiwara Salazar (Japanese: 藤原 武; born 5 August 1985 in San Salvador) is a Japanese sprinter and former Salvadorian athlete specializing in the 400 meters. Takeshi Fujiwara is currently the Record Holder in the 400mts of the city of Tokyo where the next Tokyo 2020 Olympic Games will be held in 2021. He competed at the 2004 Olympic Games in Athens where he was 6th in the heats. After that he has competed in 6 other World Championships in Italy, Japan, Spain, Qatar, Turkey and in 2017 in the Bahamas World Relay Championships as a member in the 4 × 400 m and 4 × 100 m relay squad placing 6th in the B Final for team Japan.

His mother is a former Salvadorian athlete, and National and Central American champion, while his father a former Japanese Diplomat and Judo teacher serving in El Salvador.

On 7 March 2013, he changed affiliation to Japan.

Competition record

Personal bests
Outdoor
100 metres  - 10.72 (Nacogdoches 2010)
200 metres  - 21.48 (Nacogdoches 2009)
400 metres  - 45.44 (San José 2016)

Indoor
200 metres - 22.51 (Houston 2008)
400 metres - 48.21 (Doha 2010)

References

External links

Sports reference biography
Tilastopaja biography

1985 births
Living people
Salvadoran male sprinters
Athletes (track and field) at the 2004 Summer Olympics
Olympic athletes of El Salvador
Athletes (track and field) at the 2011 Pan American Games
Pan American Games competitors for El Salvador
Salvadoran people of Japanese descent
Central American Games silver medalists for El Salvador
Central American Games medalists in athletics